The Mal are an ethnic group native to Laos and Thailand. They are one of two sub-groups of the Lua people (the other one being the Phai).

Name Variation
The Mal are also commonly referred to as Madl, Khatin, T'in, Htin, Thin, and Tin.

Language
The Mal speak a language also called Mal, which is a Khmuic language. The Khmuic languages are Austroasiatic.

Geographic Distribution
Population in Laos: 23,193 in Xaignabouli Province
Population in Thailand: 4,700
Population in United States: Unknown

Religion

See also
Mal Indian People

References

External links 
 http://projekt.ht.lu.se/rwaai RWAAI (Repository and Workspace for Austroasiatic Intangible Heritage)
 http://hdl.handle.net/10050/00-0000-0000-0003-8A2D-F@view T'in in RWAAI Digital Archive

Ethnic groups in Laos
Ethnic groups in Thailand
Khmuic peoples